Kenan Yıldız (born 4 May 2005) is a footballer who plays as an attacking midfielder for  club Juventus Next Gen. Born in Germany, he is a youth international for Turkey.

Club career

Youth career 
Yıldız was born in Germany, and began playing football at the youth academies of Sallern Regensburg and Jahn Regensburg. He joined the youth academy of Bayern Munich in 2012 at the age of 7, and worked his way up their youth categories, often acting as captain an eventually becoming a mainstay of their U19s. In his final year with the Bayern U19s in the 2021–22 season, Yıldız contributed six goals and eight assists in 20 matches.

Juventus 
Yıldız's contract with Bayern Munich expired in July 2022, and the club confirmed that they were unable to resign Yıldız. Barcelona and Juventus competed for his signing as he became a free agent. On 12 July, Juventus confirmed the signing of Yıldız. In September, he was included among the best 60 players born in 2005 by English newspaper The Guardian.

On 16 December, Yıldız was first called up to Juventus Next Gen—the reserve team of Juventus—for the match against Virtus Verona set to be played the following day. In that match, he was subbed in by coach Massimo Brambilla in the 61st minute to make his professional debut; the team lost 3–0.

International career
Yıldız was born in Germany to a Turkish father and a German mother. He is a youth international for Turkey, having represented the Turkey U17s. On 27 September 2022, Yıldız made his Turkey U21 debut, playing 28 minutes against Georgia U21.

Playing style
Yıldız is a modern midfielder, known for his strong passing and shots from outside the box. He is known for his excellent technique. His most natural role is as playmaker, and he is noted for this strong frame. Aside from midfielder, he can also play as a winger.

Career statistics

References

External links
 
 DFB Profile
 FC Bayern Profile

2005 births
Living people
Sportspeople from Regensburg
Turkish footballers
Turkey youth international footballers
German footballers
Footballers from Bavaria
FC Bayern Munich footballers
SSV Jahn Regensburg players
Juventus F.C. players
Juventus Next Gen players
Serie C players
Turkish people of German descent
German people of Turkish descent
Association football midfielders